The 2013 South American Under-15 Football Championship (Spanish: Campeonato Sudamericano Sub-15 Bolivia 2013) is the 6th South American Under-15 Football Championship for national teams affiliated with CONMEBOL. It is set to begin on November 16, and end on November 30. The winning team will represent South America in the 2014 Summer Youth Olympic Football Tournament.

Teams

 (hosts)
 (holders)

Venues
Santa Cruz and Tarija are the main venues of the tournament. Montero was announced as an extra venue days before the start of the tournament.

Referees
On October 23, 2013 a referee and an assistant referee from each country where chosen for the tournament.

|}

First round
The First round took place between the 16th and 25 November. The top two teams in the group advanced to the next stage.

If teams finish level on points, order will be determined according to the following criteria:
 superior goal difference in all matches
 greater number of goals scored in all group matches
 better result in matches between tied teams
 drawing of lots

All kick-off times are local (UTC−04:00).

Group A

Group B

Final round
The final stage is scheduled to take place between 28 November and 30 November.

Semi-finals

Third place

Final

References

External links
Futbol de Bolivia official website
CONMEBOL

South American Under-15 Football Championship
2013 in youth association football
2013–14 in Bolivian football
International association football competitions hosted by Bolivia